Edward Neville (1471–1538) was an English courtier.

Edward Neville or Nevill may also refer to:

Edward Neville (pirate) (fl. 1675–1678), English buccaneer
Edward Neville, 3rd Baron Bergavenny (bef. 1414–1476)
Edward Nevill, 7th Baron Bergavenny (bef. 1540–1588)
Edward Nevill, 8th Baron Bergavenny (c. 1550–1622)
Edward Nevill, 15th Baron Bergavenny (c. 1705–1724)
Sir Edward Neville of Grove, member of parliament for Retford

See also
Edward Neville Syfret (1889–1972), British naval officer
Edward Neville da Costa Andrade (1887–1971), English physicist, writer, and poet